Bondia dissolutana is a moth in the family Carposinidae. It was described by Edward Meyrick in 1882. It is found in Australia, where it has been recorded from New South Wales.

References

Carposinidae
Moths described in 1882